Daniel Esteban Castro Santibáñez (born 27 April 1994) is a Chilean footballer who currently plays as a forward for Primera B de Chile side Santiago Wanderers.

Career
He has become the Top Goalscorer of the fourth division of the Chilean football for three times: in 2016 playing for General Velásquez and in 2018 and 2019 playing for Deportes Limache. In 2020, he joined Unión Española in the Chilean Primera División. In 2022, he joined Santiago Wanderers in the Primera B.

Personal life
He is nicknamed Popin, like a Chilean comic TV character.

Honours
Individual
 Tercera A Top Scorer (3): 2016, 2018, 2019

References

External links
 
 Daniel Castro at playmakerstats.com (English version of ceroacero.es)

1994 births
Living people
People from Valparaíso Province
Chilean footballers
General Velásquez footballers
Deportes Limache footballers
Unión La Calera footballers
Unión Española footballers
Santiago Wanderers footballers
Chilean Primera División players
Segunda División Profesional de Chile players
Primera B de Chile players
Association football forwards